The Little Conemaugh River is a tributary of the Conemaugh River, approximately 30 mi (48 km) long, in western Pennsylvania in the United States.

The main branch rises in eastern Cambria County, along the western slope of the Appalachian ridge separating the watersheds of the Ohio and Susquehanna rivers. It flows west-southwest through the mountains, past Cassandra, Portage, and Summerhill, where it is joined by the South Fork Little Conemaugh River.  It joins the Stonycreek River at Johnstown to form the Conemaugh.

Mine drainage
The river flows through scenic mountainous areas but is considered severely degraded by abandoned mine drainage – most notably, the Hughes bore hole – from the long exploitation of the region's coal resources. The recovery of the river is an ongoing project of federal, state, and private agencies.

History
Only four navigable passes pierce the barrier range of the Appalachian Mountains in the United States, and the rivers headwaters begin on the western side of Tunnelhill, Pennsylvania, in northern Cambria County starting in Cresson Pass transited by the line of the Eastern Continental drainage divide. The river's upper valley falls off gradually enough for the terrain to form a natural transportation corridor, one navigable by muscle powered vehicles such as Indian travois and Conestoga Wagons. Consequently, when settlers pushed west from the Susquehanna basin, the waters falling or rising in the eastern side of the drainage divide, ran down through valleys Amerindians had used to travel to the connect the west to the east for centuries. When Pennsylvania made a bid to connect to the business opportunities its leaders saw in the new settlements growing rapidly in the Ohio Valley they launched the great engineering project of the Pennsylvania Canal System which connected through the valley to Johnstown. The river was paralleled by the western inclines of the Allegheny Portage Railroad, connecting the two branches of Pennsylvania Main Line Canals, with the western terminus of the portage railroad at Johnstown. Created as part of the Pennsylvania Main Line of Public Works, the Railway operated from its completion in 1834 until it was sold in 1854 to the Pennsylvania Railroad, which took over its right of ways. Thereafter, the rivers' banks have hosted one of the most important rail transport corridors running east–west across the Appalachian Mountains

On May 31, 1889, a dam on the South Fork holding back a slightly longer than 2 mile reservoir failed, sending a wall of water down the Little Conemaugh at 40 mph (64 km/h) and up to 60 ft (18 m) high, resulting in the loss of 2,209 lives in the worst civilian disaster of the 19th century in the United States. The event is remembered to history as the Johnstown Flood.

See also
List of rivers of Pennsylvania
List of tributaries of the Allegheny River
South Fork Fishing and Hunting Club

References

External links

U.S. Geological Survey: PA stream gaging stations
USGS: Stonycreek and Little Conemaugh Acid Mine Study

Rivers of Pennsylvania
Tributaries of the Kiskiminetas River
Rivers of Cambria County, Pennsylvania